Hamilton Southeastern School District is the school district for students living in Fishers, Indiana and portions of neighboring Noblesville, Indiana. The district consists of twelve elementary schools (K-4), four intermediate schools (5-6), four junior high schools (7-8), and two high schools (9-12). Hamilton Southeastern is home to the Hamilton Southeastern Royals and the Fishers Tigers. Hamilton Southeastern is the fastest growing school corporation in Indiana with 17,140 students in the 2008-09 school year increasing from 10,716 in 2002. Hamilton Southeastern is the 4th largest school district in Indiana. Its schools have very high ratings. Fourteen of the twenty-two schools in the district are four star schools as rated by the Indiana Department of Education. Geist Elementary School was named a 2016 Blue Ribbon School by the US Department of Education, an award only given to 329 schools nationally. The district had a 23.1% higher passing rate on the math/English combined ISTEP+ tests when compared to the state average in 2006-07. Currently the school district is in a lawsuit allegedly over not preventing bullying of one of the students that resulted in a suicide.

Schools

Elementary {Grades: K - 4}
 Brooks School Elementary - Bears
 Cumberland Road Elementary - Roadrunners
 Durbin Elementary - Dogs
 Fall Creek Elementary - Fish
 Fishers Elementary - Tigers
 Geist Elementary - Gators
 Harrison Parkway Elementary - Patriots 
 Hoosier Road Elementary - Rockets
 Lantern Road Elementary - Leopards
 New Britton Elementary - Bulldogs
 Sand Creek Elementary - Cougars
 Thorpe Creek Elementary - Cardinals

Intermediate {Grades: 5 - 6}
Fall Creek Intermediate - Falcons
Riverside Intermediate - Golden Hawks
Sand Creek Intermediate - Sharks
Hamilton Southeastern Intermediate - Panthers

Junior High {Grades: 7 - 8}
 Fishers Junior High School - Chargers
 Hamilton Southeastern Junior High School - Panthers
 Riverside Junior High School - Golden Hawks
 Fall Creek Junior High School - Falcons

Senior High {Grades: 9 - 12}
Fishers High School - Tigers
Hamilton Southeastern High School - Royals

References

External links
 Hamilton Southeastern Schools
 HSE High School
 Fishers High School

School districts in Indiana
Education in Hamilton County, Indiana
Fishers, Indiana